DCCB may refer to:

Direcção Central de Combate ao Banditismo (Portugal)
Direct Current Circuit Breaker
District Cooperative Central Bank - Cooperative Bank network in India